Marston Box Rail Bridge is a railway bridge currently under construction in the United Kingdom. Once complete, it will carry High Speed 2 over the M42 motorway.

History 
In November 2021, it was announced that the bridge would be installed using the box slide method to minimise disruption to the motorway.

The M42 was closed between junctions nine and ten from 24 December to 31 December 2022 for preparatory works.

In December 2022 the bridge deck was slid  into place over a period of forty hours. To allow the work to take place the southbound carraigeway was closed on 23 December and the northbound carraigeway was closed on 24 December. Both directions were reopened on 1 January 2023, two days ahead of schedule.

References 

Railway bridges in England
High Speed 2